The Receptionist is a 2016 drama film directed by London-based Taiwanese director Jenny Lu, starring Teresa Daley and Chen Shiang-chyi. Inspired by a true story, the film follows the lives of Asian migrant women who had arrived in London in hopes of a better life but end up taking jobs in an illegal massage parlor to survive. The film premiered at the Golden Horse Film Festival on 20 November 2016.

Premise
Tina is a Taiwanese graduate living in London with her British student architect boyfriend. Struggling to find work during the financial crisis of 2007–2008, Tina takes a job as a receptionist at an illegal massage parlour. As she slowly gets to know the women who work there, she is forced to question her values and morals.

Cast
Teresa Daley as Tina
Chen Shiang-chyi as Sasa
Amanda Fan as Mei 
Josh Whitehouse as Frank	
Sophie Gopsill as Lily 
Teng Shuang as Anna

Production
The film received funding from Taiwan's Bureau of Audiovisual and Music Industry Development, as well as through a crowdfunding campaign on Kickstarter.

Release
The film has been an official selection at the Edinburgh International Film Festival, the Raindance Film Festival, the Taipei Golden Horse Film Festival the Durban International Film Festival, the Milan and Salento Film Festivals and the 40th Asian American International Film Festival in New York City.

Soundtrack

Promotional song

Reception

Critical response 
The Receptionist (Jie Xian Yuan) has received an 88% rating on review aggregator website Rotten Tomatoes.

Peter Bradshaw of the Guardian lauded it as "a valuable, intelligent debut." Elizabeth Kerr in The Hollywood Reporter gave it more mixed reviews.

Accolades

References

External links
 
 
The Receptionist (Jie Xian Yuan) on Rotten Tomatoes

2016 films
Taiwanese-language films
Taiwanese drama films
British drama films
2016 drama films
Films about prostitution in the United Kingdom
Films set in London
Kickstarter-funded films
2016 directorial debut films
2010s English-language films
2010s Mandarin-language films
2010s British films